Thalpophila vitalba is a moth of the family Noctuidae. It was described by Christian Friedrich Freyer in 1834. It is found in southern Europe and north-western Africa.

References

External links
Thalpophila vitalba at Insecta.pro
Lepiforum.de

Moths described in 1834
Hadeninae
Moths of Africa
Moths of Europe
Taxa named by Christian Friedrich Freyer